Magdalena Bay is a  long bay in Comondú Municipality along the western coast of the Mexican state of Baja California Sur.  It is protected from the Pacific Ocean by the unpopulated sandy barrier islands of Isla Magdalena and Isla Santa Margarita.

Ecology 

This bay is particularly noted for the seasonal migration of the California gray whales that come here during winter to calve. The bay is also popular for commercial and sports fishing. Nearby mangrove swamps provide sanctuaries for sea birds. The bay includes the small fishing port of San Carlos, as well as Puerto López Mateos, which provides a good place to observe the whales.

Islands 

Sandy barrier islands Isla Magdalena and Isla Santa Margarita separate the bay from the Pacific Ocean. Magdalena, mostly to the north and facing northwest, is a long, slender, segmented island that parallels the coast a few miles north. There is a small settlement, Puerto Magdalena mostly active during whale watching season.

Santa Margarita, to the south, parallels the southwest-facing coast and has an area of 314 km2.  On its inland side is Puerto Cortés, the only settlement on the island, the site of a naval base administered from the 2nd Military Naval Region in Ensenada, Baja California.  It has a military-only airstrip and no official registered population.

History

As early as 1837 American whaleships visited the bay to cooper their oil and hunt sperm whales outside the bay. Between 1845–46 and 1865–66, American, as well as a few French, Dutch, and Russian, whaleships hunted gray whales in the bay during their winter calving season. They primarily caught cows and calves, but began catching bulls as the former became scarce. During the peak years from the winters of 1855–56 to 1864–65, an estimated 1,250 gray whales were caught in the bay, with a peak of about 250 whales taken by seventeen vessels in the winter of 1856–57. They also visited the bay to obtain wood, catch fish and turtles, and harvest oysters.

In 1908, an American fleet of sixteen battleships on a cruise around the world, the Great White Fleet, stopped in the Bay and carried out gunnery practice.

In 1912, there were rumors that Japan tried to purchase the harbor from Mexico.  Barbara Tuchman's book The Zimmerman Telegram mentions both the German kaiser and the Japanese Emperor as attempting to utilize this bay and perhaps Whale Bay for military naval purposes.

References

External links
 Magdalena Bay Shrimp Fishery Improvement Project

Bays of Mexico on the Pacific Ocean
Comondú Municipality
Landforms of Baja California Sur
Islands of Baja California Sur